"Supergirl" is the debut single from the German band Reamonn. The song is from their first studio album Tuesday. It was written by the complete band and produced by Steve Lyon.

Track listing
CD single
 "Supergirl" – 3:51
 "7th Son" – 4:02

Charts

Weekly charts

Year-end charts

Certifications

Anna Naklab version

In 2015, German singer Anna Naklab released a cover version featuring Alle Farben and YOUNOTUS which gained chart success in Germany too and even outsold the original in the artist's home country. The track has been also remixed by Franz Alice Stern, Daniele Di Martino, Nod One's Head and Stereo Express.

Charts

Year-end charts

Certifications

References

External links 
 Supergirl on YouTube

Reamonn songs
2000 singles
Number-one singles in Austria
Number-one singles in Poland
Songs written by Rea Garvey